Zhong Chuxi (born 18 March 1993), also known as Elane Zhong, is a Chinese actress best known for portraying Nie Xiaoqian in the 2019 film The Knight of Shadows: Between Yin and Yang.

Filmography

Film

Television series

Discography

Awards and nominations

References

1993 births
Living people
Chinese film actresses
Chinese television actresses
21st-century Chinese actresses
Actresses from Guangzhou
Shanghai Theatre Academy alumni